Mira is a comune (municipality) in the southern Veneto, northern Italy. It is part of the Metropolitan City of Venice and the 11th most populous comune of Veneto.

It is situated on the Riviera del Brenta, midway between Padua and Venice and it is crossed by SR11 Regional road. The main attractions are the Villa Foscari, designed by Andrea Palladio, and the Villa Widmann-Foscari.

The southeastern part of Mira is characterized by "barene", typical lagoon saltmarshes which are periodically submerged by the tide crossed by tidal channels. These barene constitute a third of the whole municipal area.

People
 Giuseppe Carraro - Roman Catholic bishop;
 Jacopo del Cassero - medieval politician mentioned by Dante Alighieri in the 5th canto of the Purgatory;
 Maurizio Bacchin - mayor of Mira and member of the senate

Sources
(Google Maps)

References

External links
Official website 

Cities and towns in Veneto